A heroön or heroon (plural heroa) (pl. ), also latinized as heroum, is a shrine dedicated to an ancient Greek or Roman hero and used for the commemoration or cult worship of the hero. They were often erected over his or her supposed tomb or cenotaph.

Description
The Romans and the Greeks practised an extensive and widespread cult of heroes. Heroes played a central role in the life of a polis, giving the city a shared focus for its identity. The cult typically centred on the heroön in which the hero's bones were usually believed to be contained. In a sense, the hero was considered still to be alive; he was offered meals and was imagined to be sharing feasts. His allegiance was seen as vitally important to the continued well-being of the city. This led to struggles between Greek cities for control of heroic remains.

Greek literature records how Cimon of Athens avenged the death of the legendary hero Theseus in 469 BC, finding a set of bones allegedly belonging to the hero and returning with them in triumph to Athens. Similarly, Herodotus records in his Histories that the Spartans raided the heroön of the city of Tegea, stealing the bones of Orestes. This was regarded as changing the hero's allegiance from Tegea to Sparta, ensuring that the Spartans could defeat the Tegeans as foretold by the Oracle of Delphi. (For an analogous practice in ancient Rome, see evocatio).

Many examples of heroa can be found around the tholos tombs of Mycenaean Greece and in or near the sacred areas of a number of Greek cities around the Mediterranean. A particularly well-preserved example, the so-called Tomb of Theron, can be found at Agrigento in Sicily. The Greek city of Paestum, south of Naples, has an unlooted heroon of an unknown figure, perhaps the city founder, with its contents intact (now in the museum there), including large metal vases. Another notable one, at Vergina in Greek Macedonia (the ancient city of Aigai - Αἰγαί), is thought to have been dedicated to the worship of the family of Alexander the Great and may have housed the cult statue of Alexander's father, Philip II of Macedon. The sanctuary of Zeus in Nemea also contains a heroön, this one dedicated to the infant hero Opheltes. The Heroon at Nemea was known as a popular place to practice magic due to the nature of Opheltes' death.

A well-preserved Roman heroön from the Augustan period is situated in the ancient city of Sagalassos in what is now Turkey. Another well-preserved and well-known heroön is the Library of Celsus in Ephesus, Turkey. It was built to honor a Roman senator, Tiberius Julius Celsus Polemaeanus, a consul and proconsul of Asia from 92 to 107 and governor of Asia when he died in 114. He bequeathed a large sum of money for its construction which was carried out by his son. Apart from the library in Alexandria, Egypt, it was one of the largest libraries of the ancient world.

Early examples of heroa 
The first examples of heroa in Greece were found at Late Bronze Age sites from the Mycenaean civilization. These tombs were built much like other tombs during the time, either as a shaft tomb (grave shaft) filled with elaborate grave goods, or as a tholos tomb (beehive tomb), a type of chamber tomb. In an untouched example of a Mycenaean heroön found in Pylos, the grave shaft-style tomb was dedicated to a "Griffin Warrior" whose votive objects include a mix of Mycenaean and Minoan objects. This grave group includes a large bronze sword, gold rings, jewels, and crafted seals. This shows that the Griffin Warrior Tomb might be an example of Mycenaean interaction with other areas of Greece.

Lefkandi heroön 
The tradition of building tombs to honor heroes continued from Mycenae into other areas of Greece. This can be seen by the heroön found at Lefkandi in Euboea. This site dates to around 950 BC during the Iron Age. This site differs from earlier sites, as it was built in an apsidal style. This means that one end of the tomb was shaped like a half-circle. In addition, the site is much larger than previous tombs as it reaches up to 50 meters long. The inside of this heroön contains two human remains, which have been cremated and placed in bronze amphoras. One of these remains is the hero himself, who can be identified by the hunting scene found on his amphora, as well as the many swords that were left by his tomb as grave gifts. The other set of human remains at this site is believed to be the hero's wife, who possibly was slaughtered with him when the hero died.

Olympian heroön 
This idea of using a tholos tomb for heroa continued in Greece even into the Classical Age. This is illustrated by a heroön found at the Panhellenic Sanctuary of Olympia. This tomb, which was established around 450 B.C., follows the typical tholos tomb structure with a large dome with several other rooms flanking the tomb to provide the building with a square shape. Within the tomb, there is a large earthen mound that held the ashes of the cremated hero. This tomb must is likely to have been erected for an important figure that was known across Greece, as it was located at a Panhellenic Sanctuary rather than in the astu of a particular polis. This heroön also shows the wide variety of architectural styles used on heroa depending on time period and geography, as it differs considerably from the heroa found at Leftkandi and Acragas.

Heroa in the colonies 
Heroa were common not only on the Greek mainland but also in the colonies. This can be seen at the heroön of Acragas on the south coast of Italy. This heroön, known as the oratory of Phalaris, was much more similar to classical architecture, with the building being prostyle, tetrastyle, and having columns in the Ionic order and both triglyphs and metopes, as in the Doric style. The building was constructed in 1st century BC and is surrounded by many other Greek temples. It was used as a church for a time after the end of the Greek and Roman periods.

Association with hero cults 
Heroa sites were often linked to hero cults, due to the variety of different uses for hero cults that they provided. They acted as places of worship, where cult followers could leave grave goods and other worship offerings, and were used as locations where feasts could be held to honor the hero and remember the hero's great feats. These events occurred primarily because of the Greek belief of heroes possessing special abilities that lingered locally even when he died, and it was believed that offerings and worship towards this hero would allow living cult members to tap into this power.

References

External links

 The 'Heroon' at Aigai
 Archaeology's Interactive Dig: Northwest Heroon, Archaeology, June-August 2006

Burial monuments and structures
Ancient Greek buildings and structures